The MEI Hellhound 40 mm low-velocity multi-purpose grenade is a fixed-type munition designed to be fired from a 40×46mm grenade launcher such as the M79, M203, M320 (attached to the M16 series of rifles or M4 carbine), or Milkor MK-1. The round consists of an A5 filled metal projectile body with a rotating band, a point initiating-base detonating fuze with safe and arm technology, and a cartridge case assembly. Upon impact with the target, the firing pin is driven into the detonator, which in turn initiates the spit backcharge, producing a jet which initiates the explosive train from the base forward, resulting in an armor-piercing jet of molten metal and fragmentation of the projectile body. The MEI Hellhound uses the same high-low propulsion system as other popular 40 mm grenade launchers, which keeps the recoil forces in line with other infantry small arms.

Technical information 
 Type: High-explosive dual purpose (HEDP)
 Manufacturer: Martin Electronics, Inc. (MEI)
 Body material: Steel
 Weight: 224.56 grams (87.67 grams A5)
 Fuse: SF801/M550
 Length: 110 mm
 Charge: A5
 Weapons: M79, M203, Milkor MK-1 launchers
 Penetration: 90 mm mild steel at normal impact with anti-personnel fragmentation
 Range: (Max.) 400 m (437.6 yds)
 Muzzle velocity: 80 m/s (262 ft/s)

See also 

 MEI Mercury
 China Lake NATIC (EX-41)
 SAG-30

External links 
 M433 40mm Cartridge High-explosive dual purpose (HEDP) round specs
 MEI HELLHOUND Grenade Round Specs Sheet (PDF)
 Martin Electronics, Inc. Home Page
 Defense Review: New Milkor MGL-140/MEI Hyper-Lethal 40mm Combo/Weapon System for Infantry

Rifle grenades
Fragmentation grenades
40×46mmSR Hellhound